Xantusia jaycolei is a species of lizard in the family Xantusiidae. The species is native to Mexico.

Etymology
The specific name, jaycolei, is in honor of American herpetologist Charles J. "Jay" Cole.

Geographic range
X. jaycolei is endemic to the Mexican state of Sonora.

Reproduction
X. jaycolei is viviparous.

References

Further reading
Bezy RL, Bezy KB, Bolles K (2008). "Two New Species of Night Lizards (Xantusia) from Mexico". Journal of Herpetology 42 (4): 680–688. (Xantusia jaycolei, new species).
Bezy RL, Rosen PC, Van Devender TR, Enderson EF (2017). "Southern distributional limits  of the Sonoran Desert herpeofauna along the mainland coast of northwestern Mexico". Mesoamerican Herpetology 4 (1): 137–167. (in English, with an abstract in Spanish).
Lemos-Espinal JA, Smith GR, Rorabaugh JC (2019). "A conservation checklist of the amphibians and reptiles of Sonora, Mexico, with updated species lists". ZooKeys 829: 131–160.

Xantusia
Endemic reptiles of Mexico
Reptiles described in 2008
Taxa named by Robert L. Bezy
Natural history of Sonora